The reddish tuco-tuco (Ctenomys frater) is a species of rodent in the family Ctenomyidae. Five subspecies have been recognized, some formerly designated as separate species. It is found in Argentina and Bolivia at altitudes from 600 to 4,500. This tuco-tuco is fossorial, like others in its genus. Its diet consists of underground tubers and roots. Its karyotype has 2n = 52 and FN = 78.

It lives in colonies in areas with suitably soft, dry soil. Both undisturbed and disturbed areas provide suitable habitat. Its conservation status is assessed as "Least Concern" by the IUCN.

References

Tuco-tucos
Mammals of Bolivia
Mammals of Patagonia
Mammals described in 1902
Taxa named by Oldfield Thomas
Taxonomy articles created by Polbot